The 1937 Pacific Tigers football team represented the College of the Pacific—now known as the University of the Pacific—in Stockton, California as a member of the Far Western Conference (FWC) during the 1937 college football season. Led by fifth-year head coach Amos Alonzo Stagg, Pacific compiled an overall record of 3–5–2 with a mark of 3–1 in conference play, placing second in the FWC. The team was outscored by its opponents 122 to 58 for the season. The Tigers played home games at Baxter Stadium in Stockton.

Schedule

Notes

References

Pacific
Pacific Tigers football seasons
Pacific Tigers football